Short Stories is a 1985 compilation album by Kenny Rogers, released by Liberty Records.

Overview
Though the tracks on the album have been remixed by producer Larry Butler, they had all been issued before by Rogers on his studio albums between 1976 and 1983. This album was not endorsed by Rogers as by the time it was released he had signed to RCA Nashville.

"Goodbye Marie" was released as a single in December 1985 and peaked at No. 47 on the U.S. Hot Country Songs chart in 1986.

Chronology
Short Stories rarely appears in discographies, but is labeled as 1986 where it does appear. The record itself indicates a copyright date of 1985 Liberty Records; the album can thus be placed after Love Is What We Make It for that reason, and before any 1986 album.

Track listing

References

External links

1985 compilation albums
Kenny Rogers compilation albums
Liberty Records compilation albums
Albums produced by Larry Butler (producer)